Werner Müller-Esterl (born 13 July 1948) is a German biochemist who served as president of the Goethe University Frankfurt from 2009 to 2014.

Career
Born in Bonn, he studied chemistry and medicine at the University of Bonn and the Ludwig Maximilian University of Munich. He obtained his medical license in 1979 and his habilitation in clinical biochemistry in 1985. In 1987 he became professor of clinical biochemistry in Munich. In 1989 he became professor of pathobiochemistry at the University of Mainz. In 1999 he became professor of biochemistry at the Goethe University. He was director of the Institute for Biochemistry II and the Gustav Embden Center for Biological Chemistry from 2000. His research focuses on the molecular mechanisms that control the cardiovascular system.

In 2006 he became vice president of the Goethe University. In October 2008 he was elected president of the Goethe University. He was succeeded by Birgitta Wolff in 2015.

References 

Living people
1948 births
German biochemists
University of Bonn alumni
Academic staff of Johannes Gutenberg University Mainz
Academic staff of Goethe University Frankfurt
Scientists from Bonn